Carol Jacobanis is an American voice actress. She is mostly known her voice roles in the English dubs for Japanese anime. Her work has been for New York-based recording studios such as Headline Studios, Central Park Media, TAJ Productions, 4Kids Entertainment, NYAV Post and DuArt Film and Video. She has also appeared in live-action television and film projects.

In the mid to late 1990s she was the lead singer in the New York based musical group Primrose Hill, and made several guest appearances at the Loser's Lounge concert series.

Filmography

Voice roles

Anime
Animation Runner Kuromi 2 - Hanako Shihonmatsu
Aria The Animation - Akira E. Ferrari
Boogiepop Phantom - Kanae Oikawa, Makiko Kisugi
Comic Party - Aya Hasabe, Yuka
Gall Force - Journey (OVAs 2-3)
Gall Force: New Era -  Marble
Genshiken - Saki Kasukabe
Gokusen - Yasue
Gravitation - Karouko
Harlock Saga - Elda
His and Her Circumstances - Maho Izawa
IkkiTousen: Dragon Destiny - Unchou Kan'u (credited as Janet Baywood)
Irresponsible Captain Tylor - P.O. Harumi Nakagawa, Betty
Kujibiki Unbalance - Saki Kasukabe
Labyrinth of Flames - Shinka
Magical DoReMi - Queen Lumina
Magical Witch Punie-chan - Anego
Mew Mew Power - Chrys (Ep. 14)
Munto - Laika
Ping Pong Club - Junko, Sister, Sugawara, Yuki (credited as Summer Pepper)
Pokémon - Arielle, Ellen, Pietra, Trinity, Additional voices
Pokémon Chronicles - Lola
Revolutionary Girl Utena - Aiko Wakiya, Shadow Girl C, Mari Hozumi (credited as Summer Pepper)
Shingu: Secret of the Stellar Wars - Hiromi Isozaki
Shootfighter Tekken - Kiba's Mother
The Third: The Girl with the Blue Eye - Paife
To Heart - Serika Kurusugawa
The World of Narue - Bathyscape

Non-anime
 The Boy Who Wanted To Be A Bear - Mother Bear
Winx Club (4kids Ed.) - Headmistress Griffin

Live-action dubbing
 Beautiful Target - Kyoko (credited as Jackie Howard)
 Exte: Hair Extensions - Salon Owner
 Legend of the Devil - Okuni
 Zero Woman: The Hunted - Rei

Video games
 Airforce Delta Strike - Francine. Celestial
 Winx Club video game – Headmistress Griffin

Film
 Judith - Judith (2003)
 Europe for President - Hannah Jefferson (2008)
 Loser - Therapist (2009)
 The Closed Door - Clair (2010)
 Dot - Mrs. Biltmore (2010)
 Mary and Louise - Elegant Actress (2014)
 Bridge of Faith - Miss Linsey (2014)
 Upside Down - Liz (2014)

Television
 Law & Order: Special Victims Unit - Jane Siddons (2009)
 A Crime to Remember - Peggy Fletcher (2014)

References

External links
 Official Website

Carol Jacobanis at the English Voice Actor & Production Staff Database

Living people
American voice actresses
Year of birth missing (living people)
21st-century American women